Sangeetha Rajeshwaran is a playback singer in the Tamil film industry. She lives in Chennai with her husband and two sons. Seetal Iyer, former World Space RJ, is her cousin sister. She recently participated in the Zee Tamil Sa Re Ga Ma Pa 2009 Challenge singing competition, where she and her partner Raghu reached the semi-finals.

Her most popular songs in Tamil have been composed by music director Vijay Antony. Songs produced under their combination include "Yen Enakku Mayakkam" (Naan Avanillai), "Dailamo" (Dishyum), "Karikalan" (Vettaikaaran), "Mayam Seidhayo" (Velayudham) and "Ichu Ichu" (Vedi). Sangeetha has also sung the title song "Ennai Thedi Kadhal" of the serial Kadhalikka Neramillai which aired in Vijay TV, another composition by Vijay Antony.

References

Living people
Indian women playback singers
Tamil playback singers
Year of birth missing (living people)